The EMD BL20-2 is a model of diesel electric locomotive produced by Electro-Motive Diesel in 1992. The locomotives were designed as rebuilds of the EMD GP9 with the addition of new technology, including an alternator and electronics equivalent to those of the Dash 2 line of locomotives. Despite the BL prefix, these locomotives were unrelated to the earlier EMD BL2.

EMD produced three BL20-2 demonstrators numbered 120–122, but no customers could be found for the model, which was competing in a saturated rebuilt locomotive market. The three demonstrators remain in service as part of a locomotive leasing company run by GATX and EMD's leasing division.

References

B-B locomotives
Diesel-electric locomotives of the United States
Electro-Motive Division locomotives
Railway locomotives introduced in 1992
Standard gauge locomotives of the United States